Leandro Barrera (born February 22, 1991) is an Argentine football forward who plays for Santiago Morning in Primera B de Chile.

Career

Club
Barrera began his career in the renowned youth ranks of Argentinos Juniors, making his debut in the Primera Division Argentina in 2010. Pedro Troglio handed Barrera his first team debut against Club Atlético Huracán as he came in for Andrés Romero. With Argentinos Barrera made 42 league appearances and scored three goals.

Barrera was loaned to Chivas USA of Major League Soccer on February 19, 2014, with Chivas having an option to purchase the player.

Following the 2014 season, the Chivas USA franchise was contracted by MLS. In November 2014, Barrera was available to other MLS clubs in the 2014 MLS Dispersal Draft but was not selected. In December 2014, Barrera was selected by San Jose Earthquakes in the MLS Waiver Draft.

On 25 June 2018 Leandro Barrera signed a three year professional contract with Marítimo.

References

External links
 
 
  
 

1991 births
Living people
Argentine footballers
Argentine expatriate footballers
Association football forwards
Argentinos Juniors footballers
Chacarita Juniors footballers
San Martín de San Juan footballers
All Boys footballers
Chivas USA players
San Jose Earthquakes players
C.S. Marítimo players
Argentine Primera División players
Primera Nacional players
Major League Soccer players
Primeira Liga players
Liga Portugal 2 players
Campeonato de Portugal (league) players
Expatriate soccer players in the United States
Expatriate footballers in Portugal
Argentine expatriate sportspeople in the United States
Argentine expatriate sportspeople in Portugal
Sportspeople from Mendoza Province